The 2018 New Mexico State Aggies football team represented New Mexico State University in the 2018 NCAA Division I FBS football season. The Aggies were led by sixth–year head coach Doug Martin and played their home games at Aggie Memorial Stadium. They competed as an independent. They finished the season 3–9.

Previous season
The Aggies finished the 2017 season 7–6, 4–4 in the final Sun Belt play to finish in a three-way tie for fifth place. The Aggies received a bowl bid for the first time in 57 years where they defeated Utah State in the Arizona Bowl.

Preseason

Award watch lists
Listed in the order that they were released

Schedule

Game summaries

Wyoming

at Minnesota

at Utah State

New Mexico

at UTEP

Liberty

at Louisiana

Georgia Southern

at Texas State

Alcorn State

at BYU

at Liberty

References

New Mexico State
New Mexico State Aggies football seasons
New Mexico State Aggies football